The Detroit Lions are a professional American football team based in Detroit, Michigan. They are members of the North Division of the National Football Conference (NFC) in the National Football League (NFL), and play their home games at Ford Field in Downtown Detroit.

Originally based in Portsmouth, Ohio and called the Spartans, the team began play in 1929 as an independent professional team, one of many such teams in the Ohio and Scioto River valleys. For the 1930 season, the Spartans formally joined the NFL as the other area independents folded because of the Great Depression. Despite success within the NFL, they could not survive in Portsmouth, then the NFL's smallest city. The team was purchased and moved to Detroit for the 1934 season.

The Lions have won four NFL Championships, tied for 9th overall in total championships amongst all 32 NFL franchises; although the last was in 1957, which gives the club the second-longest NFL championship drought behind the Arizona Cardinals. They are one of four current teams to have never played in the Super Bowl.

Key

Player selections

Footnotes

Detroit Lions

first-round draft picks